Sidiki Diabaté is a Malian kora player, musician and music producer born in 1992 in Bamako, Mali. He is the son of renowned kora player Toumani Diabaté and grandson of Sidiki Diabaté. Diabaté belongs to the 77th generation of musicians in a long family tradition of griots, his family being primarily kora players. His grandfather Sidiki Diabaté recorded the first ever kora album in 1970. His father's cousin Sona Jobarteh is the first female kora player to come from a Griot family. His uncle Mamadou Sidiki Diabaté is also a prominent kora player.

Sidiki Diabaté was arrested on September 24, 2020, on the count of assault on an ex-girlfriend.

Discography 
 2014 : Toumani & Sidiki, with his father Toumani Diabaté
 2016 :  Diabateba Music, Vol. 1 
 2017 : Lamomali, with -M-
 2019 : Béni

References 

1992 births
Malian Kora players
Living people
21st-century Malian people
Bambara-language singers
Griots
Malian musicians
People from Bamako